Amichai Shoham (1922 – 25 May 2021) was an Israeli footballer who played as a forward for Hapoel Petah Tikva between 1941 and 1954, as well as the Israel national team, before becoming a youth coach at Hapoel Petah Tikva.

References

1922 births
2021 deaths
Israeli footballers
Association football forwards
Israel international footballers
Hapoel Petah Tikva F.C. players
Hapoel Petah Tikva F.C. non-playing staff